Noam is a Hebrew name which means "pleasantness", and although it started as the male version of the female Na'omi (English: "Naomi" or "Noémie"), today, it is a very common Hebrew name for both males and females alike. The common name day for both genders is often 7 December.

People with the given name Noam

Political activism
 Noam Chomsky, American political activist, linguist, and philosopher.
 Noam Federman, Israeli right-wing political activist.
 Noam Bramson (born 1969), Mayor of New Rochelle.

Television and film
 Noam Steinerman, American Film director and visual artist.
 Noam Murro, Israeli American director.
 Noam Gonick, Canadian film director.
 Noam Pitlik, American television director and character actor.
 Noam Zylberman, Israeli-born voice actor, best known for the voice of Split Kit from the Garbage Pail Kids.                       
Noam Jenkins, Canadian actor.

Music
 Noam Pikelny, American banjoist.
 Noam Kaniel, Israeli singer, best known for performing the theme song to Code Lyoko.
 Noam Jacobson, Israeli singer, songwriter, and actor, member of group Latma.

Sports
 Noam Dar (born 1993), Israeli-Scottish professional wrestler.
 Noam Behr (born 1975), Israeli tennis player.
 Noam Dovrat (born 2002), Israeli basketball player.
 Noam Mills (born 1986), female Israeli Olympic fencer.
 Noam Okun (born 1978), Israeli professional tennis player.

Other fields
 Noam D. Elkies, American mathematician.
 Noam Gottesman, wealthy businessman living in the United Kingdom.
 Noam Friedlander, author and journalist.
 Noam Lanir, Israeli entrepreneur.
 Noam Nisan, Israeli computer scientist.
Noam Sienna, author and Jewish educator.
 Noam T. Wasserman, American academic.

People with the surname Noam
 Eli Noam, professor at Columbia University.
 Vered Noam, professor of Talmud at Tel Aviv University.

Political organizations
Noam Masorti Youth, part of Masorti Olami, is a Jewish youth movement with a democratically decided ideology and statement of purpose, reflecting the values of its participants. Noam offers annual summer camps for children aged 10–16, as well as year-round events and camps led by madrichim who look after the children and plan the Noam-based activities.
 Noam (political party), an Israeli political party.

See also
 Naomi (disambiguation)

References

Jewish surnames
Hebrew-language names
Hebrew masculine given names
English masculine given names